National Route 274 is a national highway of Japan connecting Kita-ku, Sapporo and Shibecha, Hokkaidō in Japan, with a total length of 371.8 km (231.03 mi).

References

National highways in Japan
Roads in Hokkaido